The Weaver building  was a flour mill and corn storage building which formerly stood alongside the half-tide basin of the North Dock in Swansea, South Wales. Standing at six storeys high, 80 ft by 40 ft by 112 ft, with its lower floor cantilevered some 10 ft above loading bays, it formed part of a complex of buildings owned by Weaver & Co. and was designed and built by the French engineer Francois Hennebique in 1897, being an early example of reinforced concrete building in Europe. The Weaver building survived World War II bombings in 1941, the general post-war clearance of other industrial buildings in the area and the filling in of the adjacent basin in the late 1960s, but was demolished in 1984 to make way for a new Sainsbury's superstore that now stands on the site. A column from the fifth floor of the original building was preserved by the Science Museum, with another piece going to Amberley Museum. Another fragment  lies by the side of the river Tawe, where a plaque  commemorates Hennebique and his achievement.

Reinforced concrete buildings, that served as grain silos, had been erected in Constanța, Brăila and Galați in Romania between 1884 and 1889 by engineer Anghel Saligny, thus prior to Weaver Company mill in Swansea.

Sources
Weaver Building, Swansea, Wales
Building at Weaver & Co. 
The story of Swansea's 'indestructible' concrete eyesore which survived WWII bombs

References

Industrial buildings completed in 1897
Buildings and structures demolished in 1984
Buildings and structures in Swansea
Demolished buildings and structures in Wales